John Calcott St Quentin was a notable New Zealand painter, designer and workers' advocate. A supporter of William Sefton Moorhouse, he unsuccessfully stood for various elections in Christchurch, seeking membership on the Canterbury Provincial Council and Christchurch City Council.

References

Year of birth unknown
Year of death unknown
19th-century New Zealand painters
19th-century New Zealand male artists
19th-century New Zealand politicians